Rubén Andrés Taucare Espinoza (born 5 July 1982) is a Chilean footballer. His last club was Deportes Iquique. He plays as centre back.

Honours

Club
Deportes Iquique
 Primera B (1): 2010
 Copa Chile (2): 2010, 2013–14

References

External links
 

1982 births
Living people
Chilean people of Mapuche descent
Chilean footballers
Chilean people of Aymara descent
Chilean Primera División players
Primera B de Chile players
Cobreloa footballers
C.D. Huachipato footballers
Deportes Iquique footballers
Association football central defenders
People from Iquique